The Vegetarian Federal Union (VFU) was a British vegetarianism organisation founded in 1889, which operated until 1911.

History 
In July 1889, a group of individuals from the London Vegetarian Society met and drew up plans to form what would become the Vegetarian Federal Union. It was originally intended to bring together all of the British vegetarian societies under the umbrella of a "Vegetarian Union", with each society having a number of votes proportional to its membership. In September of that year, after the first vegetarian International Congress in Cologne, Germany, the organisation was inspired to expand its focus to creating a global union of vegetarian societies. It was officially started at a meeting on 1 October of the same year. Arnold F. Hills of the London Vegetarian Society was elected as Chairman, W. E. A. Axon was Vice-Chairman and Josiah Oldfield was secretary.

The organisation was superseded by the International Vegetarian Union in 1908.

See also
 List of vegetarian organizations

References 

1889 establishments in the United Kingdom
1911 disestablishments in the United Kingdom
Organizations established in 1889
Vegetarian organizations
Vegetarianism in the United Kingdom